The Two Orphans may refer to:
 The Two Orphans (play), a French play of 1874 by Adolphe d'Ennery and Eugène Cormon
 The Two Orphans (1915 film), lost 1915 film starring Theda Bara
 The Two Orphans (1933 film), 1933 French film directed by Maurice Tourneur
 The Two Orphans (1942 film), 1942 Italian film directed by Carmine Gallone
 The Two Orphans (1944 film), 1944 Mexican film directed by José Benavides
 The Two Orphans (1947 film), 1947 Italian film directed by Mario Mattoli
 The Two Orphans (1950 film), 1950 Mexican film directed by Roberto Rodríguez
 The Two Orphans (1954 film) (Le due orfanelle), a 1954 French-Italian film directed by Giacomo Gentilomo
 The Two Orphans (1965 film), a French-Italian film directed by Riccardo Freda
 The Two Orphans (1976 film), an Italian-Spanish film directed by Leopoldo Savona
 Al-Yateematain, translated as The Two Orphans, 1949 Egyptian film